The National Popular Consciousness (ELASYN;  – ) is a Greek nationalist political party, which was founded in 2019. The founder and president of the party is MEP Giannis Lagos, who is currently serving 13 years in jail for his participation in Golden Dawn.

Foundation 
The National Popular Consciousness was founded by the convicted criminal and independent MEP, from the Golden Dawn, Giannis Lagos. On 9 November 2019, the Founding Conference of the party took place, which was attended by former MPs Panagiotis Iliopoulos, Giorgos Germenis and Sotiria Vlachou as well as other executives who had left the Golden Dawn. The party has also received support by the controversial far-right author Konstantinos Plevris. The Founding Declaration of the party was presented at the Conference and electoral procedures were held, through which Giannis Lagos was elected president and the Coordinating Council.

History
In December 2020, the formation of a coalition was announced by ELASYN, The Popular Hellenic Patriotic Union (LEPEN), the "Spartans" party, the United Front of Greek Ideology of Compatriots (EMEIS) and the Front Line, with the prospect of a joint electoral descent with the name K.Y.M.A of Hellenism. In February 2021, the coalition announced the collaboration of the formation with the retired captain and chief of the Popular Citizens Movement (LAKIP) Andreas Petropoulos.

In March 2021, following a meeting of the Coordinating Council and with the consent of Giannis Lagos, the party was jointly chaired by George Loukakos and Giannis Zografos. Giannis Lagos was appointed honorary president of the party.

In November 2021, ELASYN announced its departure from the K.Y.M.A of Hellenism.

Ban
In January 2023, efforts began by the Greek Government to ban parties like ELASYN from running in the 2023 elections. On February 8 2023, an amendment was nominated by the Plenary of the Hellenic Parliament, which puts a brake on the descent in the 2023 elections to parties whose leaders or founders have been convicted of criminal acts like ELASYN and others.

References 

Nationalist parties in Greece
2019 establishments in Greece
Political parties established in 2019
Anti-immigration politics in Europe
Conservative parties in Greece
Eurosceptic parties in Greece
Neo-fascist parties
Far-right political parties in Greece